Four ships of the Royal Navy have borne the name HMS Dainty:

 , previously named Repentance but renamed in 1589, was a galleon built for the voyage of discovery. She was captured by the Spanish in 1594.
  was a four-gun pink in service in 1645.
  was a D-class destroyer launched in 1932 and sunk in 1941.
  was a  destroyer launched in 1950 and broken up in 1971.

Royal Navy ship names